Period (stylized in all caps) is the debut commercial mixtape by American hip-hop duo City Girls. It was released on May 11, 2018, through Quality Control Music.

Release and promotion
"Where the Bag At" served as the mixtape's lead and only single, and was released on February 23, 2018. The mixtape's lead and only single was later released to US rhythmic contemporary radio on October 9, 2018.

The mixtape was released alongside a WorldStarHipHop-exclusive music videos for "Take Yo Man", and "Tighten Up". Music videos for "Sweet Tooth", "Period (We Live)", "Millionaire Dick", "Not Ya Main" and "Careless" followed in August, September, and October, 2018, respectively.  All the videos were shot before member JT was incarcerated on charges of credit card fraud.

Critical reception

Upon its release, the album received positive reviews.

Track listing
Track listing adapted from Tidal and XXL.

Charts

References

2018 mixtape albums
City Girls albums
Quality Control Music albums
Debut mixtape albums
Mixtape albums